Paul Kelly's Christmas Train is the twenty-eighth studio album and the first Christmas album by Paul Kelly, released on 19 November 2021. It was announced on 14 October 2021. The 22-track album traverses language and cultural significance, from a Latin hymn to a traditional Irish folk ballad, and a well-known carol sung in te reo Maori.

In 2022, the album was re-released to include "Maybe This Christmas".

Track listing

Charts

Weekly charts

Year-end charts

Release history

References

2021 Christmas albums
Paul Kelly (Australian musician) albums
EMI Records albums
Christmas albums by Australian artists